Borojevia is a genus of calcareous sponge in the family Clathrinidae. The genus is named after sponge researcher Radovan Borojevic.

Description
Calcinea in which the cormus comprises tightly anastomosed tubes. The skeleton contains regular (equiangular and equiradiate) triactines, tetractines and tripods. The apical actine of the tetractines has spines. Aquiferous system asconoid.

Species
 Borojevia aspina (Klautau, Solé-Cava & Borojevic, 1994)
 Borojevia brasiliensis (Solé-Cava, Klautau, Boury-Esnault, Borojevic & Thorpe, 1991)
 Borojevia cerebrum (Haeckel, 1872)
 Borojevia croatica Klautau, Imesek, Azevedo, Plese, Nikolic & Cetkovic, 2016
 Borojevia crystallina Fontana, Cóndor-Luján, Azevedo, Pérez & Klautau, 2018
 Borojevia paracerebrum (Austin, 1996)
 Borojevia pirella Van Soest & De Voogd, 2018
 Borojevia tetrapodifera (Klautau & Valentine, 2003)
 Borojevia tenuispinata Azevedo, Padua, Moraes, Rossi, Muricy & Klautau, 2017
 Borojevia trispinata Azevedo, Padua, Moraes, Rossi, Muricy & Klautau, 2017
 Borojevia tubulata Van Soest & De Voogd, 2018
 Borojevia voigti Van Soest & De Voogd, 2018

References

World Register of Marine Species entry

 
Clathrinidae